Heather Has Two Mommies is a children's book written by Lesléa Newman with illustrations by Diana Souza. First published in 1989, this story was one of the first pieces of LGBTQ+ children's literature to garner broad attention. While the book is often noted as the first lesbian picture book, Jane Severance's book, When Megan Went Away, also has lesbian characters and debuted ten years before Newman's. In its early years of popularity, the children's book has garnered both positive and negative attention due to the lesbian themes present in the book. On one hand, the book received praise for highlighting the parenthood of lesbian parents. On the other hand, the book drew criticism from both people against same-sex marriage and certain LGBT individuals themselves, as they thought the book did not portray same-sex parenthood correctly.

Background 
The idea for Heather Has Two Mommies was not Newman's own. While out for a walk, Newman was approached by lesbian parents and asked to write a children's story about a family like theirs. The parents explained that there were no books that they could show their daughter that portrayed the life of a family with lesbian parents. According to "The More Things Change" Newman wrote the story for this purpose, but did not expect the book to gain widespread controversy. The book was originally co-published by Newman and her friend Tzivia Gover under the auspices of Gover’s desktop publishing business, “In Other Words, Ink”. Six months after the book's publication in December 1989, it was picked up by Alyson Publications.

Summary 

The book is about a child named Heather who is raised by lesbian women: her biological mother, Jane, who gave birth to her after artificial insemination, and her biological mother's same-sex partner, Kate. At Heather's playgroup, her family situation is discussed simply and positively, as are those of other children in other family units. At first, Heather becomes upset when she realizes that many of her other peers at the playgroup have a daddy and she does not. Molly, the caretaker at the playgroup, ensures that all the children at the playgroup understand that all families are special and no family type is better than any of the others. By the end of the book, Heather's sadness goes away and she expresses gratitude for her mothers.

Reception 

The American Library Association ranked it the 9th most frequently challenged book in the United States in the 1990s. There are many people across the country that believe that this book should not be taught because it has disrespectful images of the LGBTQ+ community. There are also people that disagree with those critics.

The book and the controversy over it were parodied in the 2006 Dav Pilkey book Captain Underpants and the Preposterous Plight of the Purple Potty People. In it, the parallel-universe Miss Singerbrains (the school librarian) invites the two main characters, George and Harold, to read the book Mommy Has Two Heathers.

Reactions to the inclusion of the book in schools and libraries

Challenges 
John Leo, the editor in chief of Minding the Campus, believes that while accepting homosexuals in today's society is important, books like Heather Has Two Mommies have a different purpose, to "celebrate the wonders of double-mommy and double-daddy households." Leo insists that there is a difference between celebrating and respecting various types of familial structures and that schools should not take part in promoting certain familial structures over others. Leo is concerned that various religious conflicts could occur when children are celebrating gay family structures at school.

According to Leslea Newman, in Fayetteville, North Carolina, people tried to have Heather Has Two Mommies banned from local libraries and schools. Newman claims that they were unsuccessful in their attempts, so instead they paid for advertisements in local newspapers to convince citizens to vote against the construction of 5 new libraries in the Fayetteville area. The advertisements conveyed that the libraries were in "pursuit of legitimizing homosexuality" and compared homosexuality to "prostitution, bestiality or incest".

According to Jennifer Steele, Assistant Professor of Library and Information Science at The University of Southern Mississippi, another example of an attempted banning of the book took place in Wichita Falls, Texas. Because several residents of the city wanted to ban Heather Has Two Mommies and Daddy’s Roommate, the city council declared a resolution that would limit access to the children’s books should it reach 300 signatures. A countersuit was brought forth after the book restrictions were enforced, eventually leading to the Sund v. City of Wichita Falls, Texas (2000) court case. As a result, the District Court ruled in favor of the countersuit and allowed both books to be restored to their previous status.

In another instance, the Wasilla Public Library in Alaska also neglected to shelve the same two books, Heather Has Two Mommies and Daddy's Roommate. Ironically, the books were sent in as a gift on Banned Books Week. When citing why the book was barred from the shelves, the library cited the books were "poorly constructed, lacked engaging illustrations and seemed to lack the ability to engage young readers." The books were later sold in a fundraiser for the library.

Support 
Doris Robinson, the regional services manager at Fairview Park Regional Library in Cleveland, claims that books such as Heather Has Two Mommies should have a place in schools and libraries around the country, "as long as they tastefully, accurately and appropriately portray the subject matter." Furthermore, Robinson recognizes that keeping LGBTQ subject matter from children would do them a disservice as homosexual couples become a recognized part of society. Robinson asserts that because homosexual families deserve respect, exposing children to Heather Has Two Mommies will teach them to be more accepting of these families.

Additionally, researchers April M. Sanders and Janelle B. Mathis from the University of North Texas have concluded that in order to combat censorship and discrimination in LGBTQ+ literature, young readers, instructors, and parents must learn how to change their attitudes toward LGBTQ+ individuals. Due to the reception of Heather Has Two Mommies, The National Council of Teachers of English (NCTE) issued a resolution (2007) advocating for the inclusion of LGBTQ+ themes in the classroom, as well as standards for teacher training on such inclusions.

Analysis 
According to Jennifer Esposito, a professor at Georgia State University, Leslea Newman attempts to normalize the lesbian family structure in Heather Has Two Mommies but seems to have done just the opposite. When Heather acknowledges that she does not have a daddy it makes her sad. Esposito argues that because Heather gets upset that she does not have a father instead of wondering why she has two mothers, it portrays that there is a problem with having two mommies. Furthermore, Esposito believes that Heather Has Two Mommies "dequeers" lesbian households by making them equivalent to heterosexual households. She believes that this does a disservice to those children that live in those households because their experience in the real world is a lot different than what is portrayed in the story. Esposito thinks that books dealing with lesbian families should take the approach of informing people that these households are just as normal as other households while at the same time addressing the unique problems they face. Similarly, Esposito admonishes the manner in which queer relationships are presented. Rather than focusing on the queer relationship, Heather’s mothers are used more so as a learning experience for heterosexuals.

According to Jaime Naidoo, a scholar in children's queer literature, Newman included the depiction of artificial insemination in the first edition of the book, meaning that this book was the first to portray a lesbian couple deliberately planning the birth of their child. However, Newman later explained her regret in incorporating this detail into the book. Because parents were writing complaints about not reading the book to their children due to the scene, she decided to omit the section altogether in her 10th edition. Many people believe the novel is aimed at adults because of the artificial insemination sequence, although the book aims to be more child friendly.

According to editor Cat Yampell, Though Heather has Two Mommies faces a lot of criticism, the book has also received praise. For example, Newman explains that multiple presses have expressed interest in more manuscripts, including queer stories. Seeing as publishers are becoming more comfortable in asking for more queer content, it seems like Heather has Two Mommies has helped queer children’s literature become more accepting.

In addition, researchers argue that books such as Heather has Two Mommies can be beneficial in the educational setting. Scholars Brianna Burke and Kristina Greenfield argue that Heather Has Two Mommies can create a school environment of tolerance and inclusion of members of the LGBTQIA+ community. In addition, scholar Selena Van Horn explains that by presenting elementary school students with books that challenge heteronormativity. They can gain new perspectives on diverse family structures and critically question their prior knowledge on LGBTQIA+ related topics.

See also

Homosexuality in children's literature
Daddy's Roommate - portrays a gay couple in a similar positive light. It became point of discussion in the 2008 US Presidential Election.<ref>"Once Elected, Palin Hired Friends and Lashed Foes" Jo Becker, Peter S. Goodman and Michael Powell.  New York Times' September 14, 2008</ref>The Rainbow Cubby House - similar book in Australia.Jenny Lives with Eric and Martin - similar book that caused controversy in the United Kingdom.
"Bart Has Two Mommies" - an episode of The Simpsons'' parodying the controversy.

References

Further reading
 
 

1989 children's books
1980s LGBT literature
Children's books with LGBT themes
American picture books
Obscenity controversies in literature
LGBT-related controversies in literature
LGBT literature in the United States
Alyson Books books